The Irish League in season 1973–74 comprised 12 teams, and Coleraine won the championship.

League standings

Results

References
Northern Ireland - List of final tables (RSSSF)

NIFL Premiership seasons
1973–74 in Northern Ireland association football
North